was a town located in Yosa District, Kyoto Prefecture, Japan.

As of 2006, the town had an estimated population of 11,281 and a density of 314 persons per km2. The total area was 35.90 km2.

On March 1, 2006, Nodagawa, along with the towns of Iwataki and Kaya (all from Yosa District), was merged to create the town of Yosano.

Dissolved municipalities of Kyoto Prefecture
Yosano, Kyoto